Elachyophtalma semicostalis is a moth in the family Bombycidae. It was described by Walter Rothschild in 1920. It is found on New Guinea.

The wingspan is 48–58 mm. The forewings are thinly scaled with sooty black brown, the basal half with an olive tinge and the basal three-fifths of the costal area orange buff. The basal two-thirds of the hindwings is sooty black brown, the outer two-fifths orange golden.

References

Bombycidae
Moths described in 1920